The 2021 season for  was the 26th season in the team's existence and the fourth under the current name. The team has been a UCI ProTeam since 2005.

Team roster 

Riders who joined the team for the 2021 season

Riders who left the team during or after the 2020 season

Season victories

National, Continental, and World Champions

Footnotes

References

External links
 

Androni Giocattoli–Sidermec
2021
Androni Giocattoli–Sidermec